(R)?ex or simply Rex is an open source remote execution, configuration management and software deployment tool. 
It combines Perl and Secure Shell (SSH) for a portable, centralistic  approach to its problem domain.

Rex is an acronym for "Remote Execution".

History 
Rex originated from the need of a flexible, parallel remote execution application with software deployment and configuration management capabilities. Unsatisfied with available implementations in 2010, the author of Rex, Jan Gehring, decided to implement a Perl-based tool to cope with his requirements.

Design 

Rex is a stand-alone application executing either a single command or so-called tasks. Tasks are specified on the command line and are defined in Rexfiles. A Rexfile takes a similar role for remote execution as a Makefile does for application installation.
It is defined via a small DSL, but is essentially a Perl script. Therefore, it can contain arbitrary Perl as well.

For code reuse, configuration instructions are placed in modules which can be included by a Rexfile. A template system for configuration files is available.

For Rex to be able to work, the managed targets must provide a running SSH server and a Perl 5 interpreter.

Rex serves a variety of applications. Examples are user & group, cron, filesystem, kernel module, process and virtual machine management.

Public recognition 
Rex is discussed on conferences and in related press releases.

It was voted under the Best Open Source solutions 2013 by Initiative Mittelstand.

See also

Comparison of open-source configuration management software
Infrastructure as code (IaC)
Infrastructure as Code Tools

References

External links 
 

Orchestration software
Free software programmed in Perl